is a Buddhist temple located in the town of  Matsushima, Miyagi Prefecture, Japan. Belonging to the  Myōshin-ji-branch of Rinzai Zen, it was founded in 1647 next to Zuigan-ji as the memorial temple for Date Mitsumune, the grandson of Date Masamune. The temple is noted for its rose gardens. The mausoleum of Date Mitsumune is decorated with Namban art motifs inspired by late Sengoku period contact with the West, and has been designated an Important Cultural Property. The temple also has a Japanese garden attributed to Kobori Enshū.

Main hall
It was dismantled and moved from Edo. Inside is enshrined a Muromachi period statue of Kannon seated on a lotus throne. Made of Japanese cypress using the yoseki-zukuri technique, it is gilded over lacquer.

Mausoleum
The three-bay  or mausoleum of Date Mitsumune, grandson of Date Masamune, was built in 1647 and is an Important Cultural Property. Inside, the shrine of Date Mitsumune is decorated with motifs including spades, hearts, diamonds, clubs, roses and other western flowers. The Tamaya was damaged by the 2011 Tōhoku earthquake and tsunami.

Gardens

The gardens of Entsū-in are divided into four areas: a karesansui garden; a moss garden around a pond shaped like the character for heart (心), attributed to Kobori Enshū; a rose garden inspired by the Date encounter with the Christian west; and a natural stand of cryptomeria. In autumn the temple is celebrated for its momiji.

Pilgrimage
Entsū-in is Temple No.1 on the Sanriku 33 Kannon pilgrimage route.

See also
Zuigan-ji
Date clan
Zuihōden
Namban art

Notes

References

External links
 

1647 establishments in Japan
Myoshin-ji temples
Buddhist temples in Miyagi Prefecture
Important Cultural Properties of Japan
Mausoleums in Japan
Gardens in Miyagi Prefecture
Matsushima, Miyagi